{{Infobox official post
| post = Commander-in-Chief
| body = the Canadian Armed Forces
| native_name = 
| flag = 
| flagsize = 
| flagcaption = 
| insignia = Canadian Forces emblem.svg
| insigniasize = 120
| insigniacaption = Badge of the Canadian Armed Forces
| image = 
| imagesize = 
| alt = 
| incumbent = 
| incumbentsince = 8 September 2022
Represented byMary Simon
| type = Role
| status = 
| department = Canadian Armed Forces
| style = 
| constituting_instrument = Constitution Act, 1867Letters Patent, 1947
| precursor = 
| formation = 1 July 1867
| first = Queen Victoria
| abbreviation = C-in-C
| deputy = Chief of the Defence Staff
| website = 
}}

The commander-in-chief of the Canadian Armed Forces' exercises supreme command and control over Canada's military, the Canadian Armed Forces. Constitutionally, command-in-chief is vested in the Canadian monarch, presently . Since the Letters Patent, 1947, were signed by King George VI, the governor general of Canada—presently Mary Simon—executes most of the duties of the sovereign, including in  role as commander-in-chief. Consequently, the governor general also uses the title Commander-in-Chief of the Canadian Forces. By protocol, the title used within international contexts is Commander-in-Chief of Canada.

Constitutional provisions, title, and delegation
The Constitution Act, 1867, states that:However, beginning in 1904, the exercise of the duties of the commander-in-chief were delegated to the governor general of Canada, the monarch's representative in the country. The Militia Act from that year stated that:Following this, in 1905, the letters patent constituting the Office of the Governor General were amended to read the "Letters Patent constituting the Office of the Governor General and Commander-in-Chief."

Throughout the development of the armed forces, the monarch has remained vested with command-in-chief, while the governor general's title altered to suit the changes in the militia's structure. Following the passage of the Naval Service Act establishing the Royal Canadian Navy in 1910, the viceroy was styled Commander-in-Chief of the Militia and Naval Forces and, after the creation of the Royal Canadian Air Force in 1918, as Commander-in-Chief of the Militia and Naval and Air Forces. Following this, the Letters Patent, 1947, issued by King George VI, referred to the Office of Governor General and Commander-in-Chief in and over Canada. In 1968, following the unification of the Royal Canadian Navy, the Canadian Army, and the Royal Canadian Air Force, the commander-in-chief became the most senior officer of the Canadian Armed Forces.

As all executive power is legally reposed in the Crown, the role of commander-in-chief is the only constitutional means by which decisions are made over the deployment and disposition of the Canadian Armed Forces. Under the Westminster system's conventions of responsible government, the cabinet—which advises the sovereign or his viceroy on the exercise of the executive powers—generally exercises the Crown prerogative powers relating to the Canadian forces. Still, all declarations of war are issued with the approval, and in the name, of the monarch and must be signed by either the sovereign or the governor general, as was done with the proclamation that declared Canada at war with Nazi Germany, issued on September 10, 1939; it stated: "Whereas by and with the advice of Our Privy Council for Canada, We have signified Our Approval for the issue of a Proclamation in the Canada Gazette declaring that a State of War with the German Reich exists and has existed in Our Dominion of Canada as and from the tenth day of September, 1939."

In exercising the duties of commander-in-chief, the governor general appoints the chief of the Defence Staff, as well as royal colonels-in-chief of Canadian regiments (save for the monarch himself); approves new military badges and insignia (except for those bearing St Edward's Crown, which may only be sanctioned by the sovereign); visits Canadian forces personnel within Canada and abroad; bestows honours, decorations, and medals; and signs commission scrolls. Since 2000, the governor general also awards the Commander-in-Chief Unit Commendation to units in the Canadian Forces and allied militias that have performed extraordinary deeds or activities in highly hazardous circumstances in active combat. An insignia pin is presented to members and the unit receives a scroll and may fly a special banner.

Rank insignia
Unique commander-in-chief rank insignia is displayed on the applicable Canadian Armed Forces uniforms which the commander-in-chief may choose to wear on occasion. In accordance with the Canadian Forces Dress Instructions'', the commander-in-chief may wear a flag officer's navy uniform or a general officer's army or air force uniform with, as appropriate or desirable, a flag or general officer cap badge, a special flag or general officer sleeve braid embellished with the commander-in-chief's badge (the crest of the royal arms of Canada), and a large embroidered commander-in-chief's badge on the shoulder straps or shoulder boards with the badges facing forward.

<noinclude>

Commanders-in-chief of the Canadian Armed Forces

See also

 The Canadian Crown and the Canadian Forces
 Colonel-in-Chief

References

External links
 Department of National Defence: Governor General and Commander-in-Chief of Canada
 Commander-in-Chief | The Governor General of Canada

Commanders in chief
Military history of Canada
Military of Canada
Monarchy in Canada